Nashville Township may refer to:

 Nashville Township, Howard County, Arkansas, in Howard County, Arkansas
 Nashville Township, Washington County, Illinois
 Nashville Township, Martin County, Minnesota
 Nashville Township, Barton County, Missouri
 Nashville Township, Nash County, North Carolina, in Nash County, North Carolina

Township name disambiguation pages